Westbourne and West Cliff is a ward in Bournemouth, Dorset. Since 2019, the ward has elected 2 councillors to Bournemouth, Christchurch and Poole Council.

History 
In 2018, a local councillor said the ward was becoming ghettoized.

The ward formerly elected councillors to Bournemouth Borough Council before it was abolished in 2019.

Geography 
The Westbourne and West Cliff ward is in the south west of Bournemouth, bordering Canford Cliffs in neighbouring Poole. The ward covers the affluent suburbs of Westbourne and West Cliff, just outside Bournemouth Town Centre.

Councillors 
Two Conservative councillors.

Election results

2019 Bournemouth, Christchurch and Poole Council election

References 

Wards of Bournemouth, Christchurch and Poole